Lulenge is a sector in the Fizi territory, South Kivu, Democratic Republic of  Congo. Lulenge is located in the vicinity of the Kiloba and Makena villages and has an altitude of 943 meters.

Mining and agriculture are the region's most significant revenue-generating and economic sectors. Agricultural co-operatives function much more efficiently in Lulenge, and the Coopérative Business Centre Olive (CBCO) is the largest in the mining sector. The primary agricultural commodities are cassava, peanuts, beans, mushrooms, and rice. Aside from mining and agriculture, fishing is another source of revenue, with Lake Tanganyika situated in the eastern part of the territory. In addition, small enterprises are well-developed in the area.

Since 2018, Lulenge has been in the throes of conflicts. The emergence of the Ngumino and Twiganeho militias in November 2021 has escalated tension between Banyamulenge and Bembe people. Verbal and physical attacks targeting people designated as "Babembe" or "Tutsis" have been spreading on the internet in Lulenge.

History 
Lulenge, as a part of the Fizi territory, was an ancient chiefdom of the Bembe people, who lived in the middle of a world of cultural contrasts: to the north and east, there were patrilineal agro-pastoralist-oriented populations; to the west, there were the related patrilineal agricultural, hunting and food-gathering Lega, and to the south, there were matrilineal hunters and agriculturalists who are offshoots of the northern Luba cluster.

As a result of various economic policies pursued by the Belgian colonial administration, large numbers of cattle-herding Banyarwanda were, by the end of the 20th century, permitted to move into "unoccupied" grassland areas, moving in from Rwanda through the Uvira Territory. However, the Bembe people did not intermarry with them and were generally very truculent and hostile toward them.

During the Belgian Congo colony, the Bembe and Buyu people were subdivided into five sectors, Itombwe, Lulenge, Mutambala, Ngandja, and Tanganyika, in the midst of the 20th century.

In June 2020, two civilians were wounded by gunfire during an attack by alleged Democratic Forces for the Liberation of Rwanda (FDLR) rebels in the village of Kasolelo in the Lulenge sector. Local sources attribute the attack to rebels of the Democratic Forces for the Liberation of Rwanda, who operate in the area from the Hewa Bora forest. The assailants looted the population's possessions.

In September 2020, approximately ten people were killed after three days of fighting between militia groups in the high plateau of Fizi, Mwenga, and Uvira. The coalition of militiamen such as Android, Al-Shabaab, Twiganeho, and Ngumino, headed by Rukundo Makanika at the bastion of the Mai-Mai Mutetezi militia. According to civil society sources in Minembwe, 18 militiamen from the Makanika coalition were killed and 41 wounded, and the Mai-Mai also looted the livestock. At least 800 cows were swept by the Mai-Mai towards Lulenge and the Itombwe forest.

In October 2020, the Twiganeho, a rebel group led by a Munyamulenge (noun for Banyamulenge) army deserter, Colonel Rukundo Makanika, attacked several villages in the Itombwe sector, in the Mwenga territory as well as in the Lulenge sector, near Minembwe. The villages of Tabunde, Kukwe, Kashasha, Ibumba, Abangya, and Ibulu were set on fire, causing at least 20 fatalities. The villages were the property of the Bembe and Fuliiru people. Subsequently, the Mai-Mai of the Bembe, Fuliiru, and Nyindu communities clashed with those of the Banyamulenge until they were driven out in all villages.

In September 2022, an estimated 500 displaced households were relocated to Lulenge. The families fled clashes between the Armed Forces of the Democratic Republic of the Congo (FARDC) and Rwandan-backed rebel the National Resistance Council for Democracy (CNRD) in Hewa Bora.

See also 

 Fizi Territory
 Kipupu massacre
 Minembwe
 Bembe people
 Uvira
 Mwenga Territory

References 

Populated places in South Kivu